Huda Hamed (Arabic: هدى حمد) is an Omani writer and journalist born in 1981. She has published five collections of short stories and four novels. In 2009, her short story collection Things Are Not Where They Should Be won the Sharjah Award for Arab Creativity and Best Omani Publication.

Biography 
Huda Hamed was born in Rustaq, Oman in 1981. She graduated from the University of Aleppo with a bachelor's degree in Arabic literature. After graduation, she worked as a journalist in the cultural section of the Oman newspaper. Later, she served as editor-in-chief of Day and Day, the first Omani book-review website. She currently works as editor of Omani cultural magazine Nazwa.

In 2009, her short story Things Are Not Where They Should Be, published by Dar al-Adab, won the Sharjah Award for Arab Creativity and also Best Omani Publication. Her novel Who Counts the Stairs was one of six novels written during Najwa Barakat's writers' workshop that was later published by Dar al-Adab.

Works

Short-story collections 
 Salty Gossip (Arabic title: Namima Maliha), 2006
 Not Exactly Like I Want It (Arabic title: Laysa Beldabt Kma Ureed), 2009
 The Orange Sign (Arabic title: Al Eshara Al Burtuqaliya), 2014
 Am I Only Who Ate the Apple? (Arabic title: Ana Al Waheed Al Lathi Akala Al Tufaha?), 2018

Novels 
 Things Are Not Where They Should Be (Arabic title: Al Ashiaa Laysat Fi Makaniha), 2009
 She Who Counts the Stairs (Arabic title: Alati Ta’ud Al Salalim), 2014
 Cinderella of Muscat (Arabic title: Sandrella Al Muscat), 2016
 Our Names (Arabic title: Asamina), 2019

Awards 
 2009: the short story Things Are Not Where They Should be won the Sharjah Award for Arab Creativity and Best Omani Publication in 2009.

See also 
 Jokha Alharthi
 Nasra Al Adawi
 Khawla al-Zahiri

References 

Omani writers
Omani women writers
Omani journalists
Omani women journalists
Living people
1981 births
University of Aleppo alumni
People from Al-Rustaq